Danny Lennon (born 6 April 1969) is a Scottish football manager and former player, who was most recently the manager of Scottish League One club Clyde.

In his playing career he is best known for his spells at Raith Rovers and Partick Thistle. He also experienced international football with the Northern Ireland B side during his spell at Raith.

Lennon began his managerial career with Cowdenbeath, the club where he ended his playing days. After a successful period with the Fife club, he was appointed St Mirren manager in 2010. He won the 2012–13 Scottish League Cup with St Mirren, but his contract was not renewed when it expired in 2014. After a caretaker spell in charge of the Scotland under-21s, he managed Alloa Athletic during 2015.

After a spell as acting head coach of Airdrieonians, Lennon was appointed Clyde manager in November 2017. Under his management, Clyde secured promotion back to Scottish League One in 2019.

Playing career

Club
He began his career at Hibernian, before signing for Raith Rovers for £30,000 in 1993. Lennon was part of the Raith squad that won the Scottish League Cup in 1994, but he missed the Final due to injury. Raith qualified for the UEFA Cup thanks to winning the League Cup. Lennon scored in their tie against Bayern Munich, briefly giving Raith a 1–0 lead in the second leg in the Munich Olympic Stadium.

After leaving Raith in 1999 he played for Ayr United, Ross County, Partick Thistle, Gretna, Workington and Cowdenbeath.

On 18 November 2011, Lennon was inducted into the Partick Thistle Hall of Fame after he captained the club to successive promotions. 

Lennon briefly came out of retirement in 2019, 11 years after he had last played, bringing himself on for Clyde against Celtic colts in a Glasgow Cup match.

International
During his time at Raith Rovers, Lennon won four caps for Northern Ireland B. Lennon was eligible to play for Northern Ireland through his grandmother.

Coaching career

Cowdenbeath
Lennon was appointed as Cowdenbeath manager in 2008, replacing Brian Welsh. Lennon managed the club to two successive promotions despite the club being in significant financial trouble.

St Mirren
Lennon was appointed manager of Scottish Premier League side St Mirren on 7 June 2010, signing a two-year contract, succeeding Gus MacPherson. Lennon picked up his first win for St Mirren with a 1–0 win over Hibernian, courtesy of a goal from Craig Dargo. The Buddies finished the season in 11th place, just managing to avoid relegation.

Over the summer, Lennon decided to make wholesale changes in the playing and backroom staff and also developing a new formation and philosophy. Lennon's signings included Scottish internationals, Gary Teale from Sheffield Wednesday and Steven Thompson from Burnley. He also added Dutch players Nigel Hasselbaink and Jeroen Tesselaar while replacing long term assistant manager Iain Jenkins with a more experienced coach in Tommy Craig. St Mirren started the season in good form, beating local rivals Greenock Morton 4–2 in the Renfrewshire Cup final and beating Aberdeen in the first home game of the new season. Lennon agreed a new contract with St Mirren in November 2011, keeping him at the club until the summer of 2014.

The following season Lennon lead the Buddies to their first ever Scottish League Cup triumph in a 3–2 win over Heart of Midlothian. It was the club's first major silverware since the Scottish Cup win in 1987, and the fourth major honour in the club's history.

After the 2013–14 season was completed, St Mirren decided not to offer Lennon a new contract. During his time in Paisley, Lennon led the club to their highest league position in over 20 years, finishing eighth in both the 2011-12 and 2013-14 season.

In October 2017, Lennon was inducted into the club’s Hall of Fame, cementing his status as a St Mirren legend.

Scotland U21

In February 2015, Lennon was appointed caretaker manager of the Scotland national under-21 football team. He took charge of one friendly match, a 2–1 victory against Hungary.

Alloa Athletic
Lennon was appointed manager of Alloa Athletic in April 2015, succeeding Barry Smith. He led the "Wasps" to success in the Scottish Championship play-off final which retained the club's status in the second tier of Scottish football at the end of the 2014–15 season. After gaining just five points from their first 16 games of the 2015–16 season, Lennon resigned on 7 December 2015.

Airdrieonians
In March 2016, Airdrieonians manager Eddie Wolecki Black suffered a stroke during a match against Scottish League One opponents Cowdenbeath. In order to allow Wolecki Black time to recover from his illness, Lennon was appointed as acting head coach of the North Lanarkshire club until the end of the 2015–16 season.

Clyde
Lennon returned to management with Scottish League Two club Clyde on 13 November 2017, after the departure of Jim Chapman. The Bully Wee’s results improved in the first months of Lennon’s tenure, with the club climbing from eighth position to finish the 2017-18 season in fifth place, three points off the promotion play-offs.

On 7 May 2019, Lennon agreed terms to remain as Clyde manager for at least an additional two years, which was later extended to the end of the 2021–22 season.  

He led the Bully Wee to Scottish League One promotion on 18 May 2019, after beating Annan Athletic 2–1 on aggregate to win the promotion play-off final, thus ending their nine-year exile in the bottom tier.  This saw Lennon receive the SPFL League Two Manager of the Season award.  
In their first season back in Scottish League One, Clyde finished seventh in the 2019-20 season when it was curtailed due to the COVID-19 pandemic.

On 8 April 2022, Lennon put pen to paper on a new two-year contract with the club, on a deal until May 2024. 

On October 25 2022, the club announced that Lennon had left the club on paid authorised absence and that his assistant manager, Allan Moore will take over on an interim basis.  This was amid a nine-match winless run, despite achieving the club’s best start to a league campaign in 11 years.  A week later, on October 31, the club officially announced Lennon’s departure with immediate effect. 

At the time of his departure, Lennon holds the distinction of the Bully Wee’s longest-serving manager in 30 years.

Managerial statistics

 Lennon’s announcement as Alloa Athletic manager didn’t take effect until 9 April 2015. The intervening match against Heart of Midlothian on 8 April was taken by caretaker manager Paddy Connolly.

Honours and Achievements

Player
Raith Rovers
Scottish First Division (1): 1994–95

Partick Thistle
Scottish First Division (1): 2001–02
Scottish Second Division (1): 2000–01

Manager
Cowdenbeath
Scottish Second Division promotion (1): 2009–10
Scottish Third Division promotion (1): 2008–09
 Third Division Manager of the Month: 2008-09 (1): January 2009 
 Second Division Manager of the Month: 2009-10 (3): October 2009, November 2009, March 2010 

St Mirren
Scottish League Cup (1): 2012–13
Renfrewshire Cup (3): 2010–11, 2011–12, 2012–13

Alloa Athletic
Scottish Championship play-offs (1): 2014–15

Clyde
Scottish League One play-offs (1): 2018–19
 SPFL League Two Manager of the Season: 2018–19
 SPFL League Two Manager of the Month: 2017-18 (1): March 2018
 SPFL League Two Manager of the Month: 2018–19 (3): November 2018, January 2019, April 2019  
 North Lanarkshire Cup (2): 2020–21, 2021–22

References

External links

Living people
1970 births
Association football midfielders
Hibernian F.C. players
Raith Rovers F.C. players
Ayr United F.C. players
Ross County F.C. players
Partick Thistle F.C. players
Gretna F.C. players
Workington A.F.C. players
Cowdenbeath F.C. players
Cowdenbeath F.C. managers
St Mirren F.C. managers
Alloa Athletic F.C. managers
Airdrieonians F.C. managers
Clyde F.C. managers
Northern Ireland B international footballers
Scottish Football League managers
Scottish Football League players
Scottish football managers
Scottish footballers
Scottish Premier League managers
Scottish Premier League players
Scottish Professional Football League managers
People from Whitburn, West Lothian
Footballers from West Lothian
Scottish people of Northern Ireland descent
Scotland national under-21 football team managers
Clyde F.C. players